Ross Martin (1920–1981) was a Polish American actor.

Ross Martin can also refer to:
Ross Martin (skier) (1943–2011), Australian skier
Ross C. Martin, Canadian labour activist, unsuccessful candidate in federal election in 1993 and 2008 in Manitoba
Ross Martin, guitar and keyboard player in British pop rock band Absent Elk
Ross Martin, Scottish guitarist with folk group Dàimh
Ross Martin (American football) (born 1994), American football player

See also 
Brian Ross Martin (born 1947), Australian jurist
Harold Ross Eycott-Martin (1897–unknown), British pilot of World War I
Ross Gilmore Marvin (1880–1909), American Arctic explorer